Courts of New York include:
;State courts of New York

New York Court of Appeals
New York Supreme Court, Appellate Division (4 departments)
New York Supreme Court (13 judicial districts)
New York County Court (57 courts, one for each county outside New York City)
New York Surrogate's Court
New York Family Court
New York Court of Claims
New York City courts
New York City Criminal Court
New York City Civil Court
New York District Court
New York town and village courts

Federal courts located in New York
United States Court of Appeals for the Second Circuit (headquartered in Manhattan, having jurisdiction over the United States District Courts of Connecticut, New York, and Vermont)
United States District Court for the Eastern District of New York
United States District Court for the Northern District of New York
United States District Court for the Southern District of New York
United States District Court for the Western District of New York
United States Court of International Trade (headquartered in New York City)

Former federal courts of New York
United States District Court for the District of New York (extinct, subdivided)

See also
Judiciary of New York
New York Court of Common Pleas (historical)
New York Court for the Trial of Impeachments  (historical)
New York Court of Chancery (historical)
New York Court of General Sessions (historical)

References

Further reading
Galie, Peter J. and Bopst, Christopher, The New York State Constitution (2nd ed. 2012)

Lincoln, Charles Z., The Constitutional History of New York from the Beginning of the Colonial Period to the Year 1905 (1906)

State of New York, Department of State, New York Constitution 

The Historical Society of the Courts of the State of New York

External links
National Center for State Courts – directory of state court websites.

Courts in the United States